Cherry Hill Seminary provides higher education and practical training in Pagan ministry, as the first graduate-level education for Pagan ministry in the world. Cherry Hill Seminary offers online distance-learning classes, regional workshops, and intensive retreats.

Cherry Hill Seminary is a 501(c)3 nonprofit organization under the laws of the United States, offering master's-level degrees under authority of the state of South Carolina. Cherry Hill's business office is located in Columbia, South Carolina.

History
The seminary was founded in the early 1990s by Kirk White, Cat Chapin-Bishop and Laura Wildman-Hanlon of Vermont's Church of the Sacred Earth.  Classes were conducted first by mail, and then brought online in 2000.  The seminary was granted 501(c)3 tax-exempt status by the Internal Revenue Service in March 2007.

White recruited nonprofit consultant and Cherry Hill Seminary student Holli Emore to serve as the chair of the first working board of directors, which began meeting in January 2007.  At the end of that year, Emore became the seminary’s first executive director, and the seminary relocated its business operations and incorporation to South Carolina.  By 2012, the faculty had grown to sixty educators, most with terminal degrees.

The master's program was announced in July 2009.  In fall of 2010, 38 students were matriculated into either a master's or a certificate program, and many more took courses outside of the formal programs.

Cherry Hill Seminary granted its first Master of Divinity degree in Pagan pastoral counseling to Sandra Lee Harris of Sacred Well Congregation in May, 2012.  Evidence of that degree was submitted to the Association of Professional Chaplains as part of the recipient's application for evaluation of theological equivalency by the Board of Chaplaincy Certification, Inc. in lieu of a graduate degree from an accredited seminary.  On November 1, 2012, BCCI notified the recipient that her educational credentials had been accepted.

Academic standing
Cherry Hill Seminary has been granted an official religious exemption from South Carolina requirements for educational institutions, meaning it can legally grant Master of Divinity degrees.

Cherry Hill Seminary is unaccredited at this time.

Programs
Courses include topics in ethics, religious history, ministry, leadership, chaplaincy, ritual, spirituality and formation, social justice and more. Registered students receive access to an online classroom for course content, discussion and assignments. Most courses hold live meetings on Skype.

Master's degrees include: Master of Pagan Studies; and Master of Divinity, with areas of focus corresponding to the Department of Ministry, Advocacy and Leadership, Department of Pagan Pastoral Counseling and Chaplaincy, or Department of Theology and Religious History.

The Community Ministry Certificate is a 15-month self-study with assigned faculty mentor for non-professionals serving their communities.

Insights short courses are for anyone in the public and last only four weeks, addressing specific topics, often on popular subjects or a particular skill. 

The Seminary is gradually adding self-directed asynchronous short courses. 

Pagan Life Academy  is a series of eight print lessons (not correspondence) developed especially for incarcerated Pagans and ministers working with Pagans in correctional facilities.

The Community Ministry Certificate is a non-professional 15-month asynchronous self-study with an assigned faculty mentor. The first CMC graduates were awarded their certificates in spring of 2018.

External links
 Cherry Hill Seminary
 My First Class At Cherry Hill Seminary
 Pagan Academia and Cherry Hill Seminary with Candace Kant
 Church of Green and Blue
 Guidestar Nonprofit Profile
 Online Wiccan and Pagan Schools – Are They Right for You?
 Wendy Griffin Conference on Current Pagan Studies 2015
 Cherry Hill Seminary Awards First-Ever Pagan Master of Divinity Degree

References

Modern pagan organizations based in the United States
Seminaries and theological colleges in South Carolina
Pagan studies
Modern pagan organizations established in the 1990s